Zafar Mairaj (born on 11 October 1968, at Quetta, Balochistan) is a Pakistani drama writer, lyricist and short story writer. He primarily writes in Urdu but has also written in Brahui and Balochi. He has written more than 50 drama serials, plays and telefilms for PTV and private networks such as Aaj TV, Indus TV, Geo Entertainment, ARY Digital and Hum TV also.

Early life
He was born in Syed (Mashwani) house fathered by Mohammad Mairaj. He matriculated from Helper public school, Quetta and for intermediate he went to Tameer-e-Nau Public College, Quetta. He got the bachelor's degree in civil engineering from Balochistan University of Engineering and Technology, Khuzdar.

While he was a college student he wrote short stories, columns in magazines and newspapers, and participated in literary events. He worked as a journalist for a while until he wrote his first long play Amarbail for PTV in 1991.

Career
He chose the problems of the Lower Middle Class as a theme for his writing, as he himself belonged to the same deprived class of the society.

For PTV

For satellite channels

Awards and nominations

Accolades
He has received most nominations for Best Writer without ever winning.

References

External links
 
 zafar mairaj
 YouTube.com
 Mastikorner.com
 Pakistan-dramas.com
 NME.com
 Pakistanica.com
 Vidpk.com

1968 births
Balochi-language writers
Living people
People from Quetta
Pakistani civil engineers
Pakistani dramatists and playwrights
Pakistani television writers
Pakistani television people
Pashtun people